

Key Dates 
 3 June 2009 – Osama Hassan, Alaa Abdelghani and Koffi Ole leaves Zamalek.
 4 June 2009 – Zamalek sign Ahmed Gaafar from Itesalat for four years for € 382K.
 8 June 2009 – Zamalek sign Shawky El-Said from Al-Shams for four years for € 129K .
 10 June 2009 – Zamalek retracted from signing Shawky El-Said from Al-Shams due to unknown reasons.
 14 June 2009 – Zamalek sign Mohamed Abdel-Shafy from Ghazl El-Mehalla for five years for € 452K.
 16 June 2009 – Zamalek sign Abdul Rahim Ayew from Nania F.C. for five years for € 182K.
 20 June 2009 – Gamal Hamza leaves Zamalek and signs FSV Mainz 05 for a free deal.
 20 June 2009 – Mohamed El Morsy loaned to Al Ittihad.
 21 June 2009 – Zamalek sign Sayed Mosaad from Qanah for five years for € 128K.
 24 June 2009 – Mahmoud Samir and Alaa Kamal leaves Zamalek and signs Al Mokawloon for a free deal.
 25 June 2009 – Mohamed Abdullah and Mohamed Aboul Ela leaves Zamalek.
 27 June 2009 – Abdel Halim Ali retires and acquired by Zamalek as Assistant Coach.
 29 June 2009 – Zamalek sign Hassan Mostafa from Ahly for two years for a free deal.
 28 January 2010 – Zamalek sign Hussein Yasser from Ahly for 3.5 years for a free deal.
 30 January 2010 – Zamalek sign Rainford Kalaba from Sporting Braga for 6 months on loan for 25000 $.(failed)

Team kit 

The team kits for the 2009–10 season are produced by Adidas and was revealed since the 2008–09 season

Current squad

Players Under 21

Out on loan

Transfers

In

Out

Loan

Overall 

This section displays the club's financial expenditure's in the transfer market. Because all transfer fee's are not disclosed to the public, the numbers displayed in this section are only based on figures released by media outlets.

Spending 
Summer:  £976,598

Winter:  £0

Total:  £976,598

Income 
Summer:  £454.152

Winter:  £0

Total:  £454.152

Expenditure 
Summer:  £522.446

Winter:  £0

Total:  £522.446

Statistics

Appearances and goals

Scorers 
Includes all competitive matches.

Disciplinary record 
Includes all competitive matches. Players with 1 card or more included only.

Last updated on 21 August

* = 1 suspension withdrawn ** = 2 suspensions withdrawn*** = 3 suspensions withdrawn

Overall

Competitions

Overall

League

League table

League matches

Matches 

See 2009–10 Egypt Cup for more details.

External links 
 Zamalek - The Official Website
 Zamalek Sporting Club "English"

Zamalek SC seasons
Zamalek